Mehmet Arif or Mehmed Arif may refer to:

 Mehmed Arif Bey (1845–1898), Ottoman historian.
 Mehmet Arif Örgüç: "Hacı Arif" (1876–1940) military officer of the Ottoman Army and the Turkish army.
 Mehmet Arif Şenerim: (1877–1951) military officer of the Ottoman Army and a commander of the Turkish War of Independence.
 Mehmet Arif Bey: "Ayıcı Arif" (1882–1926) military officer of the Ottoman Army and a commander of the Turkish War of Independence.
 Mehmet Arif Ölçen: (1893–1958) military officer of the Ottoman Army and the Turkish Army.